Jim Run is a  long 1st order tributary to the Youghiogheny River in Fayette County, Pennsylvania.

Course
Jim Run rises about 1.5 miles east-northeast of Ohiopyle, Pennsylvania, and then flows west to join the Youghiogheny River about 1 mile northeast of Ohiopyle.

Watershed
Jim Run drains  of area, receives about 47.4 in/year of precipitation, has a wetness index of 342.80, and is about 88% forested.

See also
List of rivers of Pennsylvania

References

Tributaries of the Youghiogheny River
Rivers of Pennsylvania
Rivers of Fayette County, Pennsylvania